Kivaj (also Romanized as Kīvaj; also known as Gīvaj, Kavā, Kovā, and Kuva) is a village in Ardalan Rural District, Mehraban District, Sarab County, East Azerbaijan Province, Iran. At the 2006 census, its population was 326, in 93 families.

References 

Populated places in Sarab County